The Advent Conspiracy is an international movement whose stated purpose is "to bring a deeper meaning to Christmas" during the Christian season of Advent that immediately precedes it. It was created in 2006 as a reaction against consumerism surrounding the holiday. The movement advocates community support projects instead of gift giving.

Background 

In 2006, Pastors Greg Holder, Chris Seay, Rick McKinley founded the organization. They proposed spending less on gifts and giving more to the poor. In the first year, Advent Conspiracy partnered with Living Water International to build a high-capacity well in Nicaragua and 13 wells in Liberia.

Today, the Advent Conspiracy movement consists of thousands of churches and organizations around the globe. Advent Conspiracy does not accept donations and instead encourages every church, organization, family, and individual to donate their funds directly.

In November 2018, an updated and revised version of the Advent Conspiracy will be published by Wonderland Publishing.

See also

Buy Nothing Day

References

External links 
 

Christian movements
Advent
2006 introductions
Anti-consumerist groups